Sandra Albertz (born 25 January 1975) is a retired German football striker.

She won the 2005–06 UEFA Women's Cup with 1. FFC Frankfurt.

References

1975 births
Living people
German women's footballers
FCR 2001 Duisburg players
FSV Frankfurt players
1. FFC Frankfurt players
SC 07 Bad Neuenahr players
Frauen-Bundesliga players
Women's association football forwards